In enzymology, a gluconate 2-dehydrogenase is an enzyme that catalyzes the chemical reaction

D-gluconate + NADP+  2-dehydro-D-gluconate + NADPH + H+

Thus, the two substrates of this enzyme are D-gluconate and NADP+, whereas its 3 products are 2-dehydro-D-gluconate, NADPH, and H+.

This enzyme belongs to the family of oxidoreductases, specifically those acting on the CH-OH group of donor with NAD+ or NADP+ as acceptor. The systematic name of this enzyme class is D-gluconate:NADP+ oxidoreductase. Other names in common use include 2-keto-D-gluconate reductase, and 2-ketogluconate reductase.

References

 
 

EC 1.1.1
NADPH-dependent enzymes
Enzymes of unknown structure